The following albums, recorded by female solo artists and all-female groups, have sold at least 10 million copies. This list can contain any types of album, including studio albums, extended plays, greatest hits, compilations, soundtracks, and remixes. Various artists albums are eligible for inclusion if a woman is credited as the main artist by record charts and certifying organizations. The figures given do not take into account the resale of pre owned albums.

The Bodyguard soundtrack by Whitney Houston (with various artists) is the best-selling album credited to a woman; its sales are over 45 million copies since its release in November 1992. Come On Over by Shania Twain is recognized by Guinness World Records as the biggest-selling studio album by a solo female artist with over 40 million copies. Previous record holders of the best-selling album by a female artist include Carole King's Tapestry, and Whitney Houston's debut album as well Madonna with True Blue according to the Guinness World Records (1989 and 1992 editions, respectively). Madonna also has the best-selling compilation album by a female artist (and solo artist) with The Immaculate Collection, which sold around 30 million copies. Other notable appearances include Shakira, as the only Latino artist in the list thanks to her crossover album Laundry Service, and Hikaru Utada with First Love as the only Asian artist. Celine Dion has the only entirely non-English album with D'eux, which remains the best-selling French album of all-time. The Spice Girls have the best-selling album by a girl group with Spice, while Mariah Carey has the best-selling Christmas album by a female artist with Merry Christmas. Britney Spears' ...Baby One More Time remains the biggest selling debut album of all-time by a female artist.

Numerous artists have multiple entries, led by Madonna with nine of her albums and followed by Celine Dion (seven), Mariah Carey (seven), Whitney Houston (six), while Britney Spears, Enya, Shania Twain, and Janet Jackson each have three. The first five artists also have multiple albums with sales of over 20 million copies worldwide. Currently, Adele's 21 is the best-selling album of the 21st century.

Groupings are based on different sales benchmarks, the highest being for claims of at least 40 million copies, and the lowest being for claims of 10 million copies. Albums are listed in order of number of copies sold and thereafter by the release year.

List of albums

40 million copies or more

30 to 39 million copies

20 to 29 million copies

11 to 19 million copies

10 million copies

See also 
 List of best-selling albums
 List of best-selling girl groups
 List of best-selling female music artists
 List of best-selling female rappers
 List of all-female bands
 Women in music
Women in jazz
Women in Latin music
Women in punk rock
Women in rock

Notes

References

Bibliography 

Women
Women in music